Geoff or Geoffrey Evans may refer to:
 Geoff Evans (cricketer) (born 1939), English cricketer
 Geoff Evans (rugby union, born 1942), former Wales international rugby union player
 Geoff Evans (rugby union, born 1950), former England international rugby union player
 Geoff Evans (political scientist), British political scientist
 Geoffrey Evans (botanist) (1883–1963), British botanist
 Geoffrey Charles Evans (1901–1987), British Indian Army general
 Geoffrey Evans (c. 1943–2012), serial killer
 Geoffrey Evans (priest), Church of England archdeacon

See also
 Jeffrey Evans (disambiguation)